Actinidia stellatopilosa is a species of plant in the Actinidiaceae family. It is endemic to China.

References

stellatopilosa
Endemic flora of China
Endangered plants
Taxonomy articles created by Polbot